Union Omaha Soccer Club is an American professional soccer team based in Omaha, Nebraska. In 2020, the team made its debut in USL League One (USL1).

History 

In 2019, USL1 awarded a franchise to Alliance Omaha Soccer Holdings to begin play in the 2020 season, with former head coach at the University of Nebraska Omaha, Jay Mims, announced as the club's first manager. Union Omaha finished 2020 in second place to qualify for the USL1 championship game. However, the match was canceled due to an outbreak of COVID-19 within the team's roster.

By defeating the Richmond Kickers 2–0 in the second to last match of the 2021 season, the Owls became the USL League One regular-season champions and clinched the top seed for the playoffs.  Union Omaha then finished the season winning their first ever championship, beating defending champion Greenville Triumph SC 3–0 in the final.

Union Omaha made a deep run in the 2022 U.S. Open Cup, entering in the second round and advancing to the quarterfinals as the last remaining third division team in the competition. In April, the Owls defeated Major League Soccer club Chicago Fire FC in a penalty shootout in the third round, becoming the first USL1 team to defeat an MLS team in U.S. Open Cup history. After defeating fellow USL1 side Northern Colorado Hailstorm FC, Omaha played Minnesota United FC of MLS in the Round of 16 and won 2–1. They were the first third division team since Orlando City in 2013 to advance to the U.S. Open Cup quarterfinals. The club's run in the competition ended with a 6–0 defeat to hosts Sporting Kansas City in the quarterfinals; approximately 700 fans traveled from Omaha to attend the match at Children's Mercy Park in Kansas City, Kansas.

Crest 

The team's name and crest were developed through fan engagement including town halls, workshops, interviews, and online polls to reflect the entire Omaha region. In a bid to stay true to the roots of both the state and city, the team announced on October 3, 2019, the new name as a nod to the Union Pacific Railroad, with the great horned owl, a species of owl native to Nebraska, being the prominent focal point of the club's crest. The logo was designed by Matthew Wolff.

The star above the crest represents Union Omaha's one USL League One title, and was added following their 2021 title win.

Stadium 

The team plays in Werner Park, a baseball park south west of Omaha in the suburb of Papillion. The Sarpy County owned stadium was opened  in 2011, and is shared with the Omaha Storm Chasers, the Triple-A  affiliate of the Kansas City Royals. Werner Park received additional locker rooms, field enhancements, and offices to accommodate the soccer operations. During the 2022 U.S. Open Cup, the team hosted Northern Colorado Hailstorm FC at Caniglia Field, located on the campus of the University of Nebraska at Omaha.

Sponsorship

Uniform evolution 
Home: 2020–present

Away: 2020–present

Players

Staff

Current staff

Statistics and records

Year-by-year

Head coaches record 

 Includes Regular Season, Playoffs, U.S. Open Cup. Excludes friendlies.

Average attendance

Honors
USL League One playoffs
Winners: 2021
USL League One regular season
Winners: 2021

Player honors

References

External links 
 Official website

 
USL League One teams
Association football clubs established in 2019
2019 establishments in Nebraska
Sports in Omaha, Nebraska
Soccer clubs in Nebraska